The 2018 edition of the Solar Decathlon Middle East will take place in Dubai, United Arab Emirates.

Solar Decathlon Middle East 2018 

The teams selected to compete in Solar Decathlon Middle East 2018 are:

 : Team Aqua Green Ajman University of Science and Technology (United Arab Emirates)
 : American University in Dubai (United Arab Emirates)
 : American University of Ras AlKhaimah (United Arab Emirates)
 : Dhofar University (Oman)
 : Eindhoven University of Technology (Netherlands)
 : Heriot-Watt University Dubai (United Arab Emirates)
 : D'Annunzio University of Chieti–Pescara; University of Pisa; Università degli Studi della Campania Luigi Vanvitelli; University of Sassari (Italy)
 : Universiti Sains Islam Malaysia - Malaysia; University of Technology – Malaysia (Malaysia)
 , : Team EFdeN Signature Ion Mincu University of Architecture and Urbanism; Technical University of Civil Engineering of Bucharest; Birla Institute of Technology and Science, Pilani – Dubai Campus; Politehnica University of Bucharest (Romania-United Arab Emirates)
 : National Chiao Tung University (Taiwan)
 : National University of Sciences and Technology (Pakistan)
 : New York University Abu Dhabi (United Arab Emirates)
 : Qatar University (Qatar)
 : Sapienza University of Rome (Italy)
 : University of Wollongong (Australia)
 : The Petroleum Institute; Zayed University (United Arab Emirates)
 , : University of Sharjah; University of Ferrara (United Arab Emirates-Italy)
 : Virginia Tech (United States)
 : King Saud University (Kingdom of Saudi Arabia)
 : The University of Jordan (Jordan)
 : University of Belgrade (Serbia)

See also

 Solar Decathlon
 Solar Decathlon Africa
 Solar Decathlon China
 Solar Decathlon Europe
 Solar Decathlon Latin America and Caribbean

References

External links
U.S. Department of Energy Solar Decathlon
Solar Decathlon Europe 2010 & 2012

Sustainable building
Building engineering
Sustainable architecture
Low-energy building
Energy conservation
Sustainable building in Europe
Solar Decathlon